The Old Youngs Bay Bridge is a bascule bridge across Youngs Bay in Astoria, Oregon, completed in 1921. Conde McCullough was responsible for designing this bridge, his first for Oregon.

The bridge consists of two  steel bascule leaves approached over a pile trestle and timber spans. The bridge features early versions of McCullough's signature accent elements, with Art Moderne concrete pylons topped by light fixtures flanking the landings at either end of the bridge.

See also
List of bridges documented by the Historic American Engineering Record in Oregon
New Youngs Bay Bridge

References

External links

Bascule bridges in the United States
Buildings and structures in Astoria, Oregon
Bridges completed in 1921
Transportation buildings and structures in Clatsop County, Oregon
Bridges by Conde McCullough
Historic American Engineering Record in Oregon
1921 establishments in Oregon
Steel bridges in the United States
Road bridges in Oregon
Trestle bridges in the United States